Maya Karimata (also called Maya or Maja) is an island in Ketapang district in West Kalimantan Province, Indonesia.
It belongs to the Borneo archipelago and is situated at Lat: 1.15° S   Long: 109.55° E 
The principal town is Tanjungsatai

References

http://islands.unep.ch/CHB.htm

Islands of Kalimantan
Landforms of West Kalimantan
Populated places in Indonesia